The Kyrgyz Revolution of 2020 (or the Third Kyrgyz Revolution) began on 5 October 2020, in response to the previous day's parliamentary election that was perceived by protestors as unfair, with allegations of vote rigging. The results of the election were annulled on 6 October 2020. On 12 October 2020, President Jeenbekov announced a state of emergency in the capital city of Bishkek, which was approved by Parliament the following day. Jeenbekov resigned on 15 October 2020.

Background

Kyrgyzstan had faced two revolutions during the early 21st century, including the Tulip Revolution in 2005 and the Kyrgyz Revolution of 2010. In August 2020, Kyrgyz President Sooronbay Jeenbekov indicated that the parliamentary elections would not be postponed despite the coronavirus pandemic. During the elections, several parties were accused of buying votes. Several journalists also reported that they had been harassed or attacked. Out of the parties that made it into parliament, only United Kyrgyzstan consistently opposes the incumbent government led by Jeenbekov.

Political analysts have tied the 2020 protests to a socio-economic divide between Kyrgyzstan's agrarian south and more-developed north. Of the initial election results, 100 of the 120 seats were filled by southerners who supported Jeenbekov.

Timeline

5 October
The protests began on 5 October 2020, with a crowd of 1,000 people,  that grew to at least 5,000 people by evening in Bishkek (the capital of Kyrgyzstan) in protest against results and allegations of vote-buying in the October 2020 parliamentary election. After nightfall, following a police operation to clear the Ala-Too Square of protesters with tear gas and water cannons, protesters allegedly attacked police officers with rocks and injured two of them. Former President Almazbek Atambayev was freed from prison.

6 October

In the early morning of 6 October 2020, the protesters reclaimed control of the Ala-Too Square in central Bishkek. They also managed to seize the White House and Supreme Council buildings nearby, throwing paper from windows and setting them on fire, also entering the President's offices. A protestor died and 590 others were injured.

On 6 October, following the protests, the electoral authorities in the country annulled the results of the parliamentary elections. Central Election Commission member Gulnara Jurabaeva also revealed the commission was considering self-dissolution.

In the meantime, opposition groups claimed to be in power after seizing government buildings in the capital, in which several provincial governors have reportedly resigned. President Sooronbay Jeenbekov said that he faced a coup d'état, then he told the BBC, that he was "ready to give the responsibility to strong leaders".

Protestors freed former president Almazbek Atambayev and opposition politician Sadyr Japarov from prison.

Likely due to pressure from the protest, Prime Minister Kubatbek Boronov resigned, citing parliamentary deputy Myktybek Abdyldayev as the new speaker.

7 October 
Opposition parties were unsuccessful at forming a new government on Wednesday, 7 October. Following the resignation of Prime Minister Boronov, former lawmaker Sadyr Japarov was appointed to replace him. Opposition parties rejected the legitimacy of Japarov's status and instead put forward their own candidate for prime minister, Tilek Toktogaziyev. Japarov claimed that he was already the "legitimate prime minister" and that he was appointed by "the parliament's majority." Boronov's resignation, however, had yet to be confirmed by President Jeenbekov, and government websites continued to list him as the prime minister on 7 October.

Crowds gathered to protest the nomination of Japarov and demand the resignation of Jeenbekov. According to the Ministry of Healthcare, no fewer than 768 people injured during the protests have been treated by the country's hospitals and clinics as of Wednesday morning. According to Reuters, at least three distinct groups have now attempted to claim leadership.

Meanwhile, Kyrgyz parliamentarians launched impeachment procedures against Jeenbekov, according to a parliamentarian from the opposition party Ata-Meken, Kanybek Imanaliev.

9 October 
Jeenbekov declared a state of emergency, ordering troops to deploy in Bishkek. The declaration imposes a 12-hour curfew until October 21. Gunfire was heard during violent clashes in Bishkek that broke out after Jeenbekov's declaration. Jeenbekov formally accepted Boronov's resignation.

10 October 
Kyrgyzstani special forces detained former President Almazbek Atambayev in a raid on his compound. Former Member of Parliament Sadyr Japarov, who was freed from prison on October 5 by protesters, was nominated as interim Prime Minister by Parliament.

12 October 
A second state of emergency was declared by President Jeenbekov in Bishkek from 12 October to 19 October. Opposition parties announced their intentions to oust Jeenbekov; Jeenbekov stated that he would consider resigning, but only after the political crisis is resolved. A curfew was put in place, in effect from 10 pm to 5 am. Convoys of troops from the Kyrgyz military were sent into the capital city to control the situation.

13 October 
Kanat Isaev was elected as the new Speaker of the Supreme Council, as there were no other candidates seeking the position. Parliament endorsed Jeenbekov's second declaration of a state of emergency, after previously rejecting his first. President Jeenbekov formally rejected the nomination of Sadyr Japarov to the position of Prime Minister.

15 October 

Sooronbay Jeenbekov resigned as President of Kyrgyzstan in an attempt to end the political unrest, while also stating that he "Calls on Japarov and the other politicians to withdraw their supporters out of the capital of the nation and to return the people of Bishkek to peaceful lives". Japarov declared himself as acting president. Despite the Kyrgyzstan Constitution stating that the speaker of the Supreme Council should succeed the role, Kanatbek Isaev refused to assume office, resulting in Japarov becoming the acting president.

Reactions

China 
On 7 October, the Chinese Foreign Ministry spokeswoman Hua Chunying said, "As a friendly neighbor and comprehensive strategic partner, China sincerely hopes that all parties in Kyrgyzstan can resolve the issue according to law through dialogue and consultation, and push for stability in Kyrgyzstan as soon as possible."

Russia 
On 7 October, Russian President Vladimir Putin expressed that Russia is concerned by the political unrest taking place in nearby Kyrgyzstan and hoped for a swift return to stability for the former Soviet state. Russia also gave assurances it was in touch with all the sides in the conflict and hoped that the democratic process would be restored. On 8 October, Kremlin spokesman Dmitry Peskov said "The situation looks like a mess and chaos." and Russia was obliged by a security treaty to prevent a total breakdown in the country.

European Union
The European Union called on all political forces in the country to act within the framework of the constitution and to settle their disagreements peacefully.

United States
The U.S. Embassy in Bishkek expressed support for Jeenbekov, stating on 13 October that "the United States supports the efforts of President Jeenbekov, political leaders, civil society, and legal scholars to return the political life of the country to a constitutional order. It is clear that one of the obstacles towards democratic progress is the attempt by organized crime groups to exert influence over politics and elections."

See also
2013 Kyrgyzstani protests
2020s in political history
List of protests in the 21st century
2021 Kyrgyz presidential election
2021 Kyrgyz parliamentary election

References

Protests 
Protests
Kyrgyzstan
Kyrgyzstan
21st-century revolutions
History of Bishkek
October 2020 crimes in Asia
October 2020 events in Asia
Protests against results of elections
Revolutions in Kyrgyzstan
Riots and civil disorder in Kyrgyzstan
Attacks on government buildings and structures